Coleophora nanophyti is a moth of the family Coleophoridae. It is found in southern Russia, Turkestan and Uzbekistan.

The larvae feed on Nanophyton erinaceum. They create a silky, compact case with a sandy cover inside the fruit. The valve is three-sided and very short. In spring, after the sandy cover is completed during hibernation, the color of the case turns whitish-gray. The larvae can be found from September to October.

References

nanophyti
Moths described in 1972
Moths of Asia